The 1936 San Jose State Spartans football team represented San Jose State College. The Spartans were led by fifth-year head coach Dudley DeGroot and played home games at Spartan Stadium. The team played as an independent and finished with a record of five wins and four losses (5–4).

Schedule

Notes

References

San Jose State
San Jose State Spartans football seasons
San Jose State Spartans football